In ancient Roman religion, the indigitamenta were lists of deities kept by the College of Pontiffs to assure that the correct divine names were invoked for public prayers. These lists or books probably described the nature of the various deities who might be called on under particular circumstances, with specifics about the sequence of invocation. The earliest indigitamenta, like many other aspects of Roman religion, were attributed to Numa Pompilius, second king of Rome.

Sources
The books of the Pontiffs are known only through scattered passages preserved throughout Latin literature. Varro is assumed to have drawn on direct knowledge of the lists in writing his now-fragmentary theological books, which were used as a reference by the Church Fathers for their mocking catalogues of minor deities. As William Warde Fowler noted,
the good Fathers tumbled the whole collection about sadly in their search for material for their mockery, having no historical or scientific object in view; with the result that it now resembles the bits of glass in a kaleidoscope, and can no longer be re-arranged on the original Varronian plan.

Georg Wissowa, however, asserted that Varro's lists were not indigitamenta, but di certi, gods whose function could still be identified with certainty, since by the late Republic some of the most archaic deities of the Roman pantheon were not widely cultivated and understood. Another likely source for the patristic catalogues is the lost work De indigitamentis of Granius Flaccus, Varro's contemporary.

W.H. Roscher collated the standard modern list of indigitamenta, though other scholars may differ with him on some points.

Form
It is unclear whether the written indigitamenta contained complete prayer formularies, or simply an index of names. If formulas of invocation, the indigitamenta were probably precationum carmina, chants or hymns of address. Paulus defines them as incantamenta, incantations, and indicia, signs or intimations.

A further point of uncertainty is whether these names represent distinct minor entities, or epithets pertaining to an aspect of a major deity's sphere of influence, that is, an indigitation, or name intended to "fix" or focalize the action of the god so invoked. If the former, the indigitamenta might be described as indexing "significant names which bespoke a specialized divine function," for which the German term Sondergötter is sometimes used; for instance, Vagitanus gives the newborn its first cry (vagitus). If the indigitamenta record invocational epithets, however, an otherwise obscure deity such as Robigus, the red god of wheat rust, should perhaps be understood as an indigitation of Mars, red god of war and agriculture; Maia, "a deity known apparently only to the priests and the learned," would be according to Macrobius an indigitation of the Bona Dea. Roscher, however, does not consider Robigus and Maia to have been part of the indigitamenta.

Roscher's list of indigitamenta
Many of the indigitamenta are involved in the cycle of conception, birth, and child development (marked BCh); see List of Roman birth and childhood deities. Several appear in a list of twelve helper gods of Ceres as an agricultural goddess or are named elsewhere as having specialized agricultural functions (Ag). Gods not appearing on either of those lists are described briefly here, or are more fully described in their own articles as linked.

 Abeona BCh
 Adeona BCh
 Adolenda, see Acta Arvalia
 Aescolanus, god of copper money (aes) and father of Argentinus (below)
 Afferenda, goddess whose purpose was the offering of dowries
 Agenoria  BCh
 Agonius
 Aius Locutius
 Alemona BCh
 Altor Ag
 Antevorta BCh
 Arculus, tutelary god of chests and strongboxes (arcae)
 Argentinus, god of silver money; see Aescolanus above
 Ascensus, god of sloping terrain and hillsides, from the verb scando, scandere, scansus, "scale, climb"
 Aventinus
 Bubona
 Caeculus
 Candelifera  BCh
 Cardea
 Catius pater BCh
 Cela, perhaps a title of Panda
 Cinxia BCh
 Clivicola, "she who inhabits the clivus," a slope or street
 Coinquenda,  see Acta Arvalia
 Collatina, a goddess of hills (Latin collis "hill")
 Coluber, marked by Roscher as uncertain
 Commolenda or Conmolanda,  see Acta Arvalia
 Conditor Ag
 Convector Ag
 Cuba BCh
 Cunina BCh
 Decima
 Deferunda, see Acta Arvalia
 Deverra
 Domiduca
 Domiducus
 Domitius, god who preserves the home (domus) of newlyweds
 Edusa (also Educa, Edula, Edulia)
 Fabulinus  BCh
 Farinus BCh
 Fessona or Fessonia, goddess who relieved weariness.
 Fluvionia or Fluonia BCh
 Forculus, protector of doors (Latin fores)
 Fructesea, another name for Seia Ag
 Hostilina Ag
 Iana
 Inporcitor Ag
 Insitor Ag
 Intercidona
 Interduca
 Iuga BCh
 Iugatinus BCh
 Lactans Ag
 Lacturnus Ag
 Lateranus
 Levana
 Libentina or Lubentina
 Lima, a goddess of the threshold (limen)
 Limentinus, god of the limen or limes
 Limi or Limones (plural), guardian spirits (curatores) of Rome's clivi (slopes, streets)
 Locutius BCh
 Lucina  BCh
 Lucrii (plural)
 Manturna, a conjugal goddess who causes the couple to remain together (from the verb maneo, manere)
 Mellona
 Mena BCh
 Messia Ag
 Messor Ag
 Mola
 Montinus, a god of mountains; compare Septimontius
 Morta
 Mutunus Tutunus or Tutinus
 Nemestrinus, god of groves (nemora, singular nemus)
 Nenia
 Noduterensis Ag
 Nodutus Ag
 Nona
 Numeria BCh
 Nundina BCh
 Obarator Ag
 Occator Ag
 Odoria
 Orbona BCh
 Ossipago BCh
 Panda or Empanda
 Pantica
 Parca
 Partula
 Patella Ag
 Patellana Ag
 Paventina BCh
 Pellonia
 Peragenor
 Perfica
 Pertunda BCh
 Peta
 Picumnus
 Pilumnus BCh
 Pollentia
 Porrima BCh
 Postverta or Postvortia BCh
 Potina BCh
 Potua BCh
 Praestana
 Praestitia
 Prema mater BCh
 Promitor Ag
 Prorsa BCh
 Puta
 Reparator Ag
 Rediculus
 Rumina BCh
 Rumon?
 Runcina Ag
 Rusina
 Rusor
 Sarritor or Saritor Ag
 Sator Ag
 Segesta Ag
 Segetia
 Seia Ag
 Semonia
 Sentia BCh
 Sentinus BCh
 Septimontius
 Serra
 Spiniensis
 Stata Mater
 Statanus BCh
 Statilinus BCh
 Statina BCh
 Sterquilinus
 Stercutus
 Stimula, identified with Semele
 Strenia
 Subigus pater BCh
 Subruncinator Ag
 Tutanus
 Tutilina Ag
 Unxia
 Vagitanus BCh
 Vallonia
 Venilia
 Verminus
 Vervactor Ag
 Vica Pota
 Victa
 Viduus
 Virginiensis BCh
 Viriplaca
 Vitumnus BCh
 Voleta
 Volumna BCh
 Volumnus
 Volupia
 Volutina Ag

References

Ancient Roman religion
Roman deities